Wichita-class replenishment oilers comprised a class of seven replenishment oilers used by the United States Navy from the late 1960s to the mid-1990s. The ships were designed for rapid underway replenishment using both connected replenishment and vertical replenishment.

Design
The original concept for the Wichita-class was that the ships would serve the same function for the anti-submarine carrier (CVS) groups that the larger, faster Sacramento-class ships did for the attack carrier (CVA) groups. During this time the ships were commissioned naval auxiliaries with the hull classification AOR.

The ships could carry 160,000 barrels (25,438,000 litres) of fuel oil (DFM) and/or jet fuel (JP5), 600 tons of munitions, 200 tons of dry stores and 100 tons of refrigerated stores. To transfer cargo, the ships were equipped with four fueling stations and two cargo handing stations on the port side and three fueling stations and two cargo handing stations on the starboard side. As built the port forward fuel station and associated tanks were for aviation gasoline (AVGAS), but were converted after the retirement of the Navy's last piston-engined aircraft. Originally, the first six ships only had a large helicopter landing deck aft, but no hangar.  was the first ship equipped with a large double hangar for two UH-46 Sea Knight helicopters. The hangar was later retrofitted to the other ships.

With the addition of the hangar, the ships lost the originally fitted 3"/50 caliber gun twin mounts that were located abaft the stack. In the 1980s, a Mk 29 launcher for the NATO Sea Sparrow was fitted atop the hangar, and two Phalanx CIWS were added.

General Dynamics, Quincy originally encountered problems during the construction, before the production was rationalised.  took 24 months from keel laying to launch,  21 month, and  only 14 months.

With the reduction in the U.S. Navy fleet, these ships were all decommissioned and stricken from the Naval Vessel Register (NVR) in the 1990s.

Ships in class

Traditionally Navy oilers have been named for rivers; the Wichita class were named for city/river pairs with Native American names.

References

External links
NavSource Photo Archives: Replenishment Fleet Tanker (AOR) Index

 

Auxiliary replenishment ship classes
 Wichita class replenishment oiler